Schoonover refers to:
Brenda Schoonover (contemporary), American diplomat, former U.S. Ambassador to Togo
Daniel D. Schoonover (1933–1953), American soldier, Medal of Honor recipient
Frank Schoonover (1877–1972), American illustrator
Lawrence Schoonover (1906–1980), American novelist
Ray H. Schoonover (1896-1966), American politician
Terry Schoonover (1951–1984), American race car driver
Wear Schoonover (1910–1982), American college football player
Darrill Schoonover (1985), American professional mixed martial artist